The Năeni oil field is an oil field located in Năeni, Buzău County. It was discovered in 2006 and developed by Toreador Resources. It will begin production in 2015 and will produce oil.

References

Oil fields in Romania